Mount Kinch is a volcanic knob in southwestern British Columbia, Canada, located  east of Rivers Inlet. It is almost completely ice-covered.

See also
 List of volcanoes in Canada
 Volcanology of Canada
 Volcanology of Western Canada

References

 

Two-thousanders of British Columbia
Volcanoes of British Columbia
Pacific Ranges
Range 2 Coast Land District